is a Japanese professional footballer who plays for Oita Trinita as an attacking midfielder.

Club career
Umesaki is a product of Oita's youth system and was promoted to the top team in 2005. Umesaki made his J-League debut on 10 July 2005 in a match against Sanfrecce Hiroshima at Oita "Big Eye" Stadium. He became a regular in the 2006 season.

In January 2007, he was loaned out to French Ligue 2 side Grenoble Foot 38, but returned to Oita prior to the completion of his six-month loan.

On 26 December 2007, Urawa Red Diamonds announced his signing from Oita on a full transfer.

International career
In July 2007, Umsaki was elected Japan U-20 national team for 2007 U-20 World Cup. At this tournament, he played all 4 matches as left midfielder and scored a goal against Scotland in first match.

Umesaki made his international debut for Japan on 6 September 2006 in an 2007 Asian Cup qualification against Yemen when he was sent on to the pitch by national coach Ivica Osim to replace Seiichiro Maki in the injury time of the second half.

Career statistics

Club

1Includes Japanese Super Cup, J. League Championship, J.League Cup / Copa Sudamericana Championship and FIFA Club World Cup.

International

Honours

Club
Urawa Red Diamonds
AFC Champions League: 2017
J.League Cup: 2016

References

External links
 Profile at Urawa Red Diamonds
 
 
 
 Japan National Football Team Database
 Official blog 

1987 births
Living people
Association football midfielders
Association football people from Nagasaki Prefecture
Japanese footballers
Japan youth international footballers
Japan international footballers
J1 League players
Oita Trinita players
Urawa Red Diamonds players
Shonan Bellmare players
Ligue 2 players
Grenoble Foot 38 players
Japanese expatriate footballers
Japanese expatriate sportspeople in France
Expatriate footballers in France